was a Japanese actress, voice actress, singer, comedian and narrator. She was affiliated with Aoni Production at the time of her death.

Biography 
Since the age of 8 in 1958, Fujita worked in radio and television as an actress, voice actress, narrator, singer and comedian. In addition, she also sang theme songs for anime such as the 1969 adaptation of Dororo.

She also dubbed several English-language films in Japanese, as well as lending her voice to anime, such as Ikkyū-san (Ikkyu), Kiteretsu Daihyakka (Kiteretsu <Eiichi Kido>), Digimon Adventure (Taichi Yagami), Fist of the North Star (Mamiya) and Cat's Eye (Rui Kisugi). She was widely used especially in works produced by Toei Animation and Nippon Animation.

In 1984, she received the award for "Best Voice Actor" in the 1st Nihon Anime Taishou.

Sadly in her later years, her work was limited due to her poor physical condition and health problems. It was announced on December 28, 2018, that she died of invasive breast cancer at 68.

Filmography

Television Animation
1960s
Yūsei Shōnen Papii (1965-1966) (Papii)

1970s
Ikkyū-san (1975-1976) (Ikkyū) 

1980s
Patalliro! (1982–1983) (Maraich Juschenfe)
Cat's Eye (1983–1985) (Rui Kisugi)
Koara Bōi Kokki (1984-1985) (Kokki)
Fist of the North Star (1984) (Mamiya)
Dragon Ball (1986–1987) (Hasky)
Prefectural Earth Defense Force (1986) (Yūko Inoue)
Ginga Nagareboshi Gin (1986) (Cross)
Space Family Carlvinson (1988) (Mother)
Kiteretsu Daihyakka (1988-1996) (Kiteretsu)
1990s
RG Veda (1991-1992) (Shashi-oh)
Dragon Quest: The Adventure of Dai (1991-1992) (Dai)
Romeo's Blue Skies (1995) (Alfredo Martini)
Kindaichi Case Files (1997) (Koichiro Saeki)
Digimon Adventure (1999–2000) (Taichi Yagami)
Outlaw Star (1998) (Hilda) 
Silent Möbius (1998) (Rally Cheyenne) 

2000s
Digimon Adventure 02 (2000–2001) (Taichi Yagami)
Inuyasha (2002–2003) (Madam Exorcist)
Glass Mask (2005-2006) (Chigusa Tsukikage) 
Zatch Bell! (2006) (Zofis)
Deltora Quest (2007-2008) (Theagan) 
Hellsing Ultimate (2008) (Queen of England) (vol. 4)
Allison & Lillia (2008) (Corazón Muto)
Ultraviolet: Code 044 (2008) (Onna no Koe)
Kurozuka (novel) (2008) (Saniwa) 

2010s
Digimon Fusion (2010-2012) (Taichi Yagami) 
Chihayafuru (2011–2013) (Taeko Miyauchi)
One Piece (2012) ("Big Mom" Charlotte Linlin) (ep. 571)

Theatrical film
Puss in Boots (1969) (Pierre)
Golgo 13: The Professional (1983) (Cindy, Doctor Zed)
Saint Seiya: The Movie (1987) (Eris)
Bonobono (1993) (Bonobono) (first film only)
Chopper's Kingdom on the Island of Strange Animals (2002) (Karasuke)

Video games
Kessen (2000) (Okatsu)
Digimon Rumble Arena (2001) (Taichi Yagami)
Fist of the North Star (2005) (Mamiya)
Yakuza Kenzan (2008) (Mistress of Tsuruya)
Sands of Destruction (2008) (Creator)
Jump Force (2019) (Dai) (Final role)

Dubbing Roles

Live-Action
48 Hrs. (1985 NTV edition) (Elaine Marshall (Annette O'Toole))
Above the Law (1993 TV Asahi edition) (Delores "Jacks" Jackson (Pam Grier))
Air Force One (U.S. Vice President Kathryn Bennett (Glenn Close))
Alfie (Liz (Susan Sarandon))
Beverly Hills Cop (1988 TV Asahi edition) (Jeanette "Jenny" Summers (Lisa Eilbacher))
Blue Velvet (Dorothy Vallens (Isabella Rossellini))
Coogan's Bluff (Julie Roth (Susan Clark))
DeepStar Six (Joyce Collins (Nancy Everhard))
The Exorcist (2001 NTV edition) (Chris MacNeil (Ellen Burstyn))
Elizabeth R (Elizabeth I of England)
Friends with Benefits (Lorna (Patricia Clarkson))
Georgia Rule (Georgia Randall (Jane Fonda))
Good Bye, Lenin! (Christiane Kerner (Katrin Sass))
The Goonies (1988 TBS edition) (Mikey (Sean Astin))
Halloween (Laurie Strode (Jamie Lee Curtis))
The Jane Austen Book Club (Bernadette (Kathy Baker))
The Lovely Bones (Grandma Lynn (Susan Sarandon))
Mary, Queen of Scots (Elizabeth I)
Murphy Brown (Murphy Brown (Candice Bergen))
National Lampoon's Christmas Vacation (Ellen Griswold (Beverly D'Angelo))
Sabrina the Teenage Witch (Zelda Spellman (Beth Broderick))
The Stepford Wives (Claire Wellington (Glenn Close))
Stuart Little (Mrs. Keeper (Julia Sweeney))
Tequila Sunrise (Jo Ann Vallenari (Michelle Pfeiffer))
This Boy's Life (Caroline Wolff Hansen (Ellen Barkin))

Animation
Cinderella (Drizella Tremaine)
Lady and the Tramp (Lady)
Lady and the Tramp II: Scamp's Adventure (Lady)
Stuart Little 3: Call of the Wild (The Beast)
Tarzan (Kala)
Tarzan II (Kala)
Tom and Jerry (Jerry and Nibbles) (original series)
Balto II: Wolf Quest (Jenna)
Balto III: Wings of Change  (Jenna)
The Flight of Dragons (Danielle)

References

External links
Official agency profile 
Toshiko Fujita at the Seiyuu database

1950 births
2018 deaths
Actresses from Dalian
Anime singers
Aoni Production voice actors
Deaths from cancer in Japan
Deaths from breast cancer
Japanese child actresses
Japanese expatriates in China
Citizens of Japan through descent
Japanese video game actresses
Japanese voice actresses
Musicians from Dalian
20th-century Japanese actresses
21st-century Japanese actresses
20th-century Japanese women singers
20th-century Japanese singers
21st-century Japanese women singers
21st-century Japanese singers